The Romance of Sleepy Hollow is a 1923 New Zealand film written and directed by Henry J. Makepeace, and produced and shot in Auckland. The film is now lost, with a poster the only surviving material. The poster says it is “A Bright Sparkling Comedy-Drama in Four Reels .... The first to be produced in New Zealand,”.  The film was to open at “The Grand” theatre in central Auckland opposite the G.P.O. on 22 August 1924.

Sam Edwards says it may have been a melodrama set in Auckland, as the poster says  "Maoriland Pictures presents Francis X. Bouzaid of Onehunga and June Phillips of Dominion Road" supported by four other local couples. It was shot on 35 mm, silent, and black & white. The film was submitted to the censor in November 1923, who required the removal of some 900 feet (around 15 minutes). This reduced it from 5700 feet to 4800 feet or about 80 minutes. Nothing now remains of the film apart from the poster.

References
New Zealand Film 1912-1996 by Helen Martin & Sam Edwards p32 (1997, Oxford University Press, Auckland) 

1923 films
1920s New Zealand films
Lost New Zealand films
Films set in New Zealand
1923 comedy-drama films
Films set in the 1920s
Films shot in New Zealand
New Zealand silent films
1923 lost films
1920s English-language films